Johannes Wilhelmus Huisinga (born 12 May 1950) is a retired Dutch rower. He competed at the 1972 Summer Olympics in the coxed eights event and finished in ninth place.

References

1950 births
Living people
Dutch chief executives in the rail transport industry
Dutch male rowers
Olympic rowers of the Netherlands
Rowers at the 1972 Summer Olympics
Sportspeople from Hilversum
20th-century Dutch people